Garrison Island is a river island in Wood County, Wisconsin. The island is on the Wisconsin River at the city of Wisconsin Rapids.

Garrison Island was named after Frank Garrison, a former owner of the site.

References

Landforms of Wood County, Wisconsin
River islands of Wisconsin